Montréal/Boisvert & Fils Water Airport  is located on the River des Prairies, near Montreal, Quebec, Canada and is open from May until the middle of November. It is classified as an airport by Nav Canada and is subject to regular inspections by Transport Canada.

See also
 List of airports in the Montreal area

References

Certified airports in Quebec
Seaplane bases in Quebec